Rita Lee is a Brazilian singer, composer, writer and Latin Grammy Award for Best Portuguese Language Rock or Alternative Album winner. She has released twenty-one studio albums, six live albums, sixteen compilation albums, one extended play, two spoken word albums, three remix albums and 81 singles. Rita Lee sold millions of records in Brazil, and is the best-succeeding MPB female composer in history.

Rita Lee began her career as the lead vocalist of the Brazilian rock group Os Mutantes. In 1970, she released her first solo album Build Up, which was produced by Arnaldo Baptista, who was also a member of the group at the time. Since it was a side project from Os Mutantes, the album failed to achieve success in Brazil.

After Lee was removed from the band in late 1972, she started her solo career. She released an album as a duo with Lúcia Turnbull, before meeting the band Lisergia, which eventually became her backing band Tutti Frutti. In 1974, Rita Lee and Tutti Frutti released their first album Atrás do Porto Tem Uma Cidade, but only in the following year, with the album Fruto Proibido, Lee and the group would become well known in the country. Fruto Proibido sold over 700,000 copies in Brazil and produced big radio hits such as Ovelha Negra, Agora Só Falta Você and Esse Tal De Roque Enrow.

In late 1970's, Rita Lee ended her musical partnership with Tutti Frutti and started recording with her husband Roberto de Carvalho. Since then, the couple released many best-seller albums in the country, such as Rita Lee (1979), Rita Lee (1980), Rita Lee & Roberto de Carvalho (1982) and Balacobaco. In 2012, Lee announced a temporary retirement from music, due to physical tiredness. In 2021, Lee was featured in the track Amarelo, Azul e Branco, from the album Cor of the Brazilian duo Anavitória. The song achieved moderate success in the country, despite not being officially released as a single.

Albums

Studio albums

International albums

Live albums

Compilation albums

Collaborative albums

Remix albums

Spoken word albums

Extended plays

Singles

As lead artist

Other appearances

References

Discographies of Brazilian artists
Pop music discographies
Rock music discographies